RSV may refer to:

Biology and medicine
 Respiratory syncytial virus, causing respiratory disease

 Rous sarcoma virus, causing cancer in chickens

Road vehicles
 Several Aprilia motorcycles, e.g.RSV4
 Minicar RSV, a US safety concept car

Sea vessels
 Ship prefix for Research Survey Vessel
 USV RSV (Marine Tech), an unmanned RSV

Other meanings
 Revised Standard Version, an English Bible translation
 Royal Society of Victoria, Australia, a scientific society 
 Rijn-Schelde-Verolme, a former Dutch shipbuilder
 Several Stampe et Vertongen aircraft, e.g. RSV.22-180
 RSV Media Center, a Belize broadcaster